The papal conclave held from 2 to 28 September 1823 ended with the election of Annibale della Genga to succeed the death recently deceased Pius VII as pope. Della Genga took the name Leo XII.

Pius VII, who had been elected in 1800, had an unusually long pontificate, during which the Catholic Church had faced, in the French Revolution and its aftermath, a severe attack on its power and legitimacy. Pius himself had been a prisoner of Napoleon in France for six years.

Description

The , though anti-liberal, were much more moderate and favoured a conciliatory approach to dealing with the problems that new ideologies and the incipient Industrial Revolution were creating. The leader of this faction was Pius VII's Cardinal Secretary of State, Ercole Consalvi, but the zelanti wanted a much less moderate pontiff and they set fervently to this task from the time of Pius VII's death.

The length of Pius VII's papacy had a significant influence because of the forty-nine electors who participated in the conclave, only Giulio Maria della Somaglia and Fabrizio Dionigio Ruffo were already cardinals when Pius VII was elected in 1800. Forty-seven of the forty-nine electors had had no experience electing a pope.

A number of cardinals were thought at the beginning of the conclave to be possible successors to Pius VII. Antonio Gabriele Severoli was at first seen as the most likely papabile, but the veto of Francis I, Emperor of Austria ruled him out when he looked to have a reasonable chance.

Francesco Saverio Castiglioni then emerged as the most likely candidate. The deceased pope Pius VII had in fact seemingly endorsed Castiglioni by having referred to the latter as Pius VIII, and indeed the candidate who was eventually elected predicted during the conclave that Castiglioni would someday reign under that name (as he did, succeeding the elected Leo in 1829).  Castiglioni lost support in the 1823 conclave when the zelanti Cardinals came to realize that he was quite close to Consalvi.

Following the decline of Castigioni's support in this conclave, the experienced Cardinal della Somaglia then had a turn as a possible candidate, but for some the mere fact that he had signed his letters "Citizen Somaglia" during the occupation of the Papal States by Napoleon I of France ruled him out.

It was only then that the eventual winner, Vicar of Rome Annibale della Genga, who was being promoted by the zelanti, began to gather support. As a result, della Genga was elected on 28 September and took the regnal name Leo XII.

Leo XII was crowned as Pope on 5 October 1823.

See also
Fabrizio Turriozzi

References

Sources
Artaud de Montor, Alexis François (1843). Histoire du Pape Léon XII. Paris 1843, I, pp. 26–84. 
Cipolletta, Eugenio (1863). Memorie politiche sui conclavi da Pio VII a Pio IX, compilate su documenti diplomatici segreti. Milano: Legros e Marazzani 1863, pp. 127–164 [based on Neapolitan documents]. 
Iervese, Marco (2016). "La registrazione dei voti nel Barberiano latino 4662." Sermattei and Regoli, Il conclave e l'elezione di Leone XII Genga, pp. 307–317. 
Sermattei, Ilaria Fiumi; Regoli, Roberto (edd.) (2016). Il conclave e l'elezione di Leone XII Genga, castello, chiesa di San Clemente 31 luglio - 28 agosto 2016. Stampato dal Consiglio Regionale Assemblea legislativa delle Marche. Quaderni del Consiglio Regionale delle Marche, n. 209. Ancona 2016. 

1823 in the Papal States
1823
1823 elections
1823 elections in Europe
19th-century Catholicism
1823 in Christianity
September 1823 events